is a junction railway station in Kanazawa-ku, Yokohama, Kanagawa Prefecture, Japan, operated by the private railway operator Keikyu.

Lines
Kanazawa-hakkei Station is served by the Keikyū Main Line and is located 40.9 kilometers from the official starting point of the line at Shinagawa Station, in Tokyo. It is also a terminal station for both the Keikyū Zushi Line and the Kanazawa Seaside Line, with the Kanazawa Seaside Line station located approximately 150 m to the east of the Keikyū station.

Station layout
Kanazawa-hakkei Station is an elevated station with two island platforms serving four tracks. Track 4 is dual-gauge (1,067 mm narrow gauge and 1,435 mm standard gauge) to allow narrow-gauge rolling stock to be moved at night from the nearby J-TREC factory to JR tracks via Zushi Station.

Keikyū platforms

Kanazawa Seaside Line platforms
The Kanazawa Seaside Line station is located south of the Keikyū station, and is an elevated single track, single side platform station for bi-directional traffic. The Kanazawa Seaside Line station is a temporary station, with construction connecting the Seaside Line to the Keikyū station beginning in early 2016. On 26 January 2019, the new entrance to the Keikyu side opened. The old entrance on the Keikyu side was made redundant and it is not possible to use the entrance because the stairs leading up to the platforms were blocked.

History

Kanazawa-hakkei Station was opened on April 1, 1930, as a station on the Shonan Electric Railway, which merged with the Keihin Electric Railway in 1941. The station was rebuilt in July 1987.

The name Kanazawa Hakkei ("Eight Views of Kanazawa") is taken from the name of a series of ukiyo-e woodblock prints of eight places in the area, which were made between 1835 and 1836, by Andō Hiroshige.

Since 2010, all Limited Express (Kaitoku) trains stop at this station.

Keikyū introduced station numbering to its stations on 21 October 2010; Kanazawa-hakkei Station was assigned station number KK50.

See also
 List of railway stations in Japan

References
 Miura, Kazuo. Keikyū　Kakuekiteisha to Kamakura Monogatari. Inban Publishing　(1998).

External links

Keikyu Kanazawa-hakkei Station 

 (Keikyu),  (Yokohama New Transit)

Railway stations in Kanagawa Prefecture
Railway stations in Japan opened in 1930
Keikyū Main Line
Keikyū Zushi Line
Kanazawa Seaside Line
Railway stations in Yokohama